Spath, is a small village north of Uttoxeter, Staffordshire, England. For population details as taken at the 2011 census see Uttoxeter Rural.

Spath is on the River Tean and is divided from Uttoxeter by the A50 road.

In UK railway history, Spath is notable as the site of the first automatic (i.e. train-operated) level crossing in the United Kingdom (AHBC: automatic half barrier crossing), which came into operation on 5 February 1961.

The railway closed four years later, and has now been dismantled, the road which crossed it via the automatic crossing is now gated and only leads to a farm and there is no remaining visible sign of the crossing.

Spath was the original home of Stevensons of Uttoxeter, a bus company that celebrated its 80th Anniversary in 2007.

Notes

Villages in Staffordshire
Staffordshire Moorlands